Randesund Church is a parish church of the Church of Norway in Kristiansand Municipality in Agder county, Norway. It is located in the Frikstad neighborhood in the Randesund district in the borough of Oddernes inside the city of Kristiansand. It is one of the churches for the Randesund parish which is part of the Kristiansand domprosti (arch-deanery) in the Diocese of Agder og Telemark. The white, wooden church was built in a cruciform design in 1864 using plans drawn up by the architect Christian Heinrich Grosch. The church seats about 450 people.

The church was consecrated on 28 October 1864 by the Bishop Jacob von der Lippe. The church is surrounded by a cemetery.

Media gallery

See also
List of churches in Agder og Telemark

References

Churches in Kristiansand
Wooden churches in Norway
Cruciform churches in Norway
19th-century Church of Norway church buildings
Churches completed in 1864
1864 establishments in Norway